George Meisner
(March 19, 1845 – March 2, 1909) was a prominent German-born American banker, bank owner, bank president, builder of the Shelton Opera House, and namesake for Meisner's Bank in Shelton, Nebraska and the George Meisner House.

In a move that was criticized by some Republicans, on October 21, 1882, at the Buffalo County Republican Convention held in Kearney, Nebraska, Meisner a member of the Democratic Party, was nominated as a representative of Buffalo County for the Republican Party.

After Meisner's death, the total value of his estate was appraised at over $600,000.

References 

National Register of Historic Places

 Biographical Souvenir on the Counties of Buffalo, Kearney and  Phelps, Nebraska, 1890. Retrieved 2012-08-07.

External links 
  
 http://bchs.us/BTales_198705.html  Buffalo County Historical Society

1845 births
1909 deaths
American bankers
German emigrants to the United States
People from Shelton, Nebraska
19th-century American businesspeople